Hobex is an American funk group from North Carolina.

History
Hobex was formed by singer/guitarist Greg Humphreys after the demise of his prior ensemble, Dillon Fence, alongside drummer Steve Hill (originally from Johnny Quest) and bassist Andy Ware. Their first release was 1996's Payback EP, which was a regional hit in the southeastern United States. Their debut full-length, Back in the 90s, came out in 1998 but was re-released on Slash/London Records in 1999 as the band gained press. 2000's Wisteria and 2002's U Ready Man? (featuring members of a side project of Squirrel Nut Zippers called The Jazz Squad Horns) followed. The group took a break from recording before returning with 2007's Enlightened Soul.

Members
Current Members
Greg Humphreys - vocals, guitar, songwriting
Andy Ware - Bass
Dan Davis - Drums
Doug Largent - Organ
Robert Cantrell - Percussion
Tim Smith - Sax

Former members
Steve (The Doctor) Hill - drums
Dustin Clifford - Drums
April Howell - backing vocals

Discography
Payback EP (Symbiotic Records, 1996)
Back in the 90's (Phrex Records, 1998; re-released on London Records, 1999)
Wisteria (Phrex, 2000)
U Ready Man? (Tone-Cool/Artemis Records, 2002)
Enlightened Soul (Phrex, 2007)

References

External links
Hobex Official Website
Hobex on MySpace
Hobex: Free the Music by Setting the Trend From Honest Tune.

American funk musical groups
Musical groups from North Carolina